CUNEF University is a Spanish private university, located in Madrid and specialising in Business and Economics, Mathematics and Computer Science and Digital Business, Law and Institutions.

History 
In 1973, the Higher Banking Council, now called the Spanish Banking Association, founded the university as the University College of Financial Studies. At that time, the institution operated as an affiliated center of the Complutense University of Madrid.

In 2019, it was recognised as an independent university. Its academic trajectory as an independent private university began in the 2021-2022 academic year.

External links

References 

Universities in the Community of Madrid